Liverson Mng'onda is an Anglican bishop  in Kenya: he is the current Bishop of Taita–Taveta.

References

21st-century Anglican bishops of the Anglican Church of Kenya
Anglican bishops of Taita–Taveta
Living people
Year of birth missing (living people)